The Armored train Štefánik was a military train used during World War II (during the Slovak National Uprising) in Slovakia.

The building of the armored train started on September 4, 1944. It was finished on September 18, 1944, in a Railway Manufacture in Zvolen, Slovakia.

It was equipped with:
 the 75mm Czechoslovak mountain cannon vz. 15 in a cannon carriage
 2 37mm cannons in two tank carriages (LT vz. 35)  
 10 7.92mm machineguns

The commander of the train was Captain F. Adam, and his assistant was Lieutenant A. Tököly. The crew was 70 men. Its first action was on September 27, 1944, at the line Hronská Dúbrava – Kremnica. Near Stará Kremnička it was fighting against a German army advancing to Zvolen. When moving to Hronská Dúbrava, the German Luftwaffe destroyed the train's locomotive. After repair, it successfully fought at Žiar nad Hronom, Jalná and Hronská Dúbrava, from where it moved on October 18, 1944, to Krupina, where it fought against SS Schill. Two days later, it moved to Dobrá Niva, where it was attacked several times by the German Luftwaffe. After a German attack on October 25, 1944, it left Zvolen as the last train, moved to Banská Bystrica and then moved to Ulmanka, where it was blocked by a retired train. After discarding all weapons the crew continued fighting as a partisan battalion.

Interesting fact is, that not only tank turrets, but whole tanks were used in tank cars. LT vz. 35 tank was placed on flat car, and then armored construction was built around it.

Preserved wagons are displayed in outdoor exposition of the Museum of Slovak National Uprising in Banská Bystrica.

See also 
 Armored train Hurban

References

Slovak National Uprising
Armoured trains of Slovakia